Rixton Clay Pits (also known as Rixton Claypits) is a former clay extraction site in Rixton, near Hollins Green, Warrington, England. Formerly farmland, boulder clay extraction started in the 1920s for brick making in the adjacent brickworks, and ceased in 1965 - since then it has been allowed to return to nature. It is now an area of ponds, scrub, woodland and damp grassland. It is owned and managed by Warrington Borough Council as a local amenity.

Two large sections of Rixton Clay Pits,  in total, are a Site of Special Scientific Interest (SSSI) and a designated Special Area of Conservation, on account of its calcareous grassland communities and because it supports the largest breeding population of Great Crested Newts in Cheshire. The whole was established as a local nature reserve in 1996, and has waymarked paths and a visitor centre.

Fishing is permitted on the lake between the two sections of SSSI, and is controlled by the Warrington Anglers Association, the main stock being tench, bream and roach. Carp and pike are also present.

References

External links 
Natural England SSSI citation for Rixton Clay Pits
Natural England map of the Rixton Clay Pits SSSI
Natural England map of the Rixton Clay Pits Local Nature Reserve
Natural England details of Rixton Clay Pits LNR

Sites of Special Scientific Interest in Cheshire
Lakes and reservoirs of Cheshire
Local Nature Reserves in Cheshire
Landforms of Cheshire
Wetlands of England